Third person, or third-person, may refer to:

 Third person (grammar), a point of view (in English, he, she, it, and they)
 Illeism, the act of referring to oneself in the third person
 Third-person narrative, a perspective in plays, storytelling, or movies
 Third-person view, a point of view in video games where the camera is positioned above the player character or characters
 Third-person shooter, a genre of 3D shooters with a third-person point of view
 The Third Person, a graphic novel by Emma Grove
 Third Person (band), a 1990s musical trio formed in New York City
 Third Person (film), a 2013 film

See also
 First person (disambiguation)
 Second person (disambiguation)
 Third party (disambiguation)
 Third (disambiguation)